Major General Winston Joseph Dugan, 1st Baron Dugan of Victoria,  (3 September 1876 – 17 August 1951), known as Sir Winston Dugan between 1934 and 1949, was a British administrator and a career British Army officer. He served as Governor of South Australia from 1934 to 1939, then Governor of Victoria until 1949.

Background and education
Dugan was the son of Charles Winston Dugan, of Oxmantown Mall, Birr, County Offaly, Ireland, an inspector of schools. His mother was born Esther Elizabeth Rogers. He attended Lurgan College, Craigavon, Ireland from 1887 to 1889, and Wimbledon College, Wimbledon, London, England. The family name was pronounced as "Duggan". They were originally from County Galway and were a branch of the Soghain people.

Military career
Dugan was a sergeant in the Royal Sussex Regiment, but transferred to the Lincolnshire Regiment as a second lieutenant on 24 January 1900. He left Southampton two months later with a detachment sent to reinforce the 2nd battalion of his regiment in the Second Boer War. While in South Africa, he was appointed adjutant of his battalion on 28 June 1901, and promoted to lieutenant on 1 November 1901. For his service in the war, he received the Queen's South Africa Medal with three clasps. He later fought with distinction in the First World War, where he was wounded and mentioned in despatches six times. His commanded 184th (2nd South Midland) Brigade on the Western Front in 1916. He was awarded the Distinguished Service Order (DSO) in 1915 and appointed a Companion of the Order of St Michael and St George (CMG) in 1918. In 1929 he was made a Companion of the Order of the Bath (CB) and the following year he was promoted to major general. From June 1931 to June 1934 he commanded the 56th (London) Infantry Division, Territorial Army.

Governor of South Australia
In 1934, Dugan was appointed Governor of South Australia. He was appointed a Knight Commander of the Order of St Michael and St George (KCMG), retired from the army and moved to Adelaide with his wife. They became an extremely popular and glamorous vice-regal couple. Sir Winston and Lady Dugan were both excellent public speakers, and travelled widely to bring problems to the attention of the ministers of the day. He gave moral and financial support to numerous good causes and needy individuals. Upon the expiration of his term, there was bipartisan parliamentary support for him to serve a second term, but he had already accepted an appointment to be Governor of Victoria.

Governor of Victoria
Sir Winston and Lady Dugan arrived in Melbourne on 17 July 1939. They continued their active role in community affairs, promoting unemployment reduction and making the ballroom of Government House, Melbourne available for the Australian Red Cross.

Dugan had an active role stabilising state politics during the tumultuous 1940s. Upon the disintegration of Albert Dunstan's Country Party government in 1943, he installed the Labor leader John Cain as premier. Four days later, Dunstan formed a coalition with the United Australia Party. Following the collapse of that ministry in 1945, Dugan dissolved parliament and called a general election for November, which resulted in the balance of power being held by independents. Dugan commissioned Cain to form the ministry of a minority government.

Dugan's term as governor was extended five times. He was also the Administrator of the Commonwealth on two occasions: from 5 September 1944 to 30 January 1945, between the departure of the governor-general, Lord Gowrie, and the arrival of his successor, Prince Henry, Duke of Gloucester; and from 19 January to 11 March 1947, between the departure of the Duke of Gloucester and the appointment of his successor, William McKell. He returned to England in February 1949. On 7 July 1949 he was raised to the peerage as Baron Dugan of Victoria, of Lurgan in the County of Armagh.

Personal life
Dugan married Ruby Lilian, daughter of Charles Abbott of Kilcaskan, County Cork, in 1912. There were no children from the marriage. He died at Marylebone, London, on 17 August 1951, aged 74.

References

External links

Craigavon Historical Society – Lurgan College Register (includes brief biography)
King's College London Archives

|-

1876 births
1951 deaths
Military personnel from County Offaly
Royal Sussex Regiment soldiers
Politicians from County Offaly
British Army personnel of the Second Boer War
British Army generals of World War I
Royal Lincolnshire Regiment officers
British Army major generals
Governors of South Australia
Governors of Victoria (Australia)
Knights Grand Cross of the Order of St Michael and St George
Companions of the Order of the Bath
Companions of the Distinguished Service Order
People educated at Lurgan College
Barons created by George VI